Faust is an unincorporated community in Madison County, North Carolina, United States.  The community is nestled in the Walnut Mountains, located along Laurel Valley Road (SR 1503), which connects to nearby US 23A.  The community is part of the Asheville Metropolitan Statistical Area.

References

Unincorporated communities in Madison County, North Carolina
Unincorporated communities in North Carolina